(To Be) Young, Gifted and Black may refer to:

To Be Young, Gifted and Black (play), 1968, based on the collated autobiographical writings of Lorraine Hansberry 
To Be Young, Gifted and Black: Lorraine Hansberry in Her Own Words (1969), posthumous autobiography of Lorraine Hansberry (1930–1965)
To Be Young, Gifted and Black, a 1972 made-for-television movie directed by Michael Schultz, based on the play about Lorraine Hansberry

Music
"To Be Young, Gifted and Black", 1969 song by Nina Simone with lyrics by Weldon Irvine in memory of Lorraine Hansberry 
Young, Gifted and Black (Bob Andy and Marcia Griffiths album), 1970 album by Bob and Marcia
Young, Gifted and Black, 1972 album by Aretha Franklin 
"YGM (Young, Gifted and Mixed)", song by group Atmosphere on the 2007 mixtape Strictly Leakage

1968 neologisms
Quotations from literature
Quotations from music